Yarem Qayah-e Sofla (also Romanized as 'Yārem Qayah-e Soflá, Yarem Qayyah-e Soflá, and Yārem Qīyeh-ye Soflá; also known as Yarim Ghiyeh Sofla and Yārīm Qīyeh-ye Soflá) is a village in Sari Su Rural District of Bazargan District of Maku County, West Azerbaijan province, Iran. At the 2006 National Census, its population was 573 in 129 households. The following census in 2011 counted 625 people in 177 households. The latest census in 2016 showed a population of 691 people in 195 households; it was the largest village in its rural district.

References 

Maku County

Populated places in West Azerbaijan Province

Populated places in Maku County